Makis Belevonis (born 19 December 1975) is a Greek former professional footballer who played as a right back.

Belevonis spent many years in the Greek first division with OFI Crete, Kalamata and Panetolikos.

References

1975 births
Living people
Greek footballers
Panetolikos F.C. players
OFI Crete F.C. players
Kalamata F.C. players
Association football defenders
Footballers from Agrinio